Sarcelles – Lochères is the only album from the progressive rock/protopunk French band Red Noise, of whom Patrick Vian was the most notable member.

History
Vian had gained some prominence as a guitar player with Red Noise (which was associated with Ame Son); the band formed at the Sorbonne in 1968, and played its first show during the occupation of the university. According to Vian, these were exciting times: he later commented that in Red Noise's early days, "their concerts wouldn't end until the cops came."

The band released its only album, Sarcelles – Lochères, in 1970. The group broke up after being arrested in the Netherlands for possession of hash. Given the revolutionary times, the band split rather appropriately into a socialist and a Trotskyist section, the latter of which continued under the name Komintern.

Sarcelles – Lochères was released on LP in 1970, and re-released on CD by Futura Records in 1996.

Track listing
Cosmic, Toilet Ditty (0:39)
Caka Slow / Vertebrate Twist (4:20)
Obsession Sexuelle N°1 (0:28)
Galactic Sewe-Song (4:03)
Obsession Sexuelle N°2 (0:12)
Red Noise Live Au Café Des Sports (2:07)
Existential-Import Of The Screw-Driver Eternity Twist (2:02)
20 Mirror Mozarts Composing On Tea Bag And 1/2 Cup Bra (2:28)
Red Noise En Direct Du Buffet De La Gare (2:14)
A La Mémoire Du Rockeur Inconnu (0:39)
Petit Précis D'Instruction Civique (0:35)
Sarcelles C'Est L'Avenir (18:56)

Personnel

Musicians
Patrick Vian – guitar, vocals
Philip Barry – guitar, drums, vocals
Daniel Geoffroy – bass, vocals
John Livengood – organ
Austin Blue – percussion
Jean-Claude Cenci – saxophone, flute, vocals

Production
Produced by Gérard Terronès
Recorded on 28 November 1970, at studio Europasonor, engineered by Pierre Guichon

Artwork
Patrick Vian – collage
Jean Buzelin – cover
H. van der Meer – painting

References

Futura Records albums
1970 debut albums